The 1977 Air Canada Silver Broom was held from March 28 to April 3 at the Färjestads Ishall in Karlstad, Sweden.

Teams

Round-robin standings

Round-robin results

Draw 1

Draw 2

Draw 3

Draw 4

Draw 5

Draw 6

Draw 7

Draw 8

Draw 9

Playoffs

Semifinals

Final

References

External links

World Men's Curling Championship
Curling
Air Canada Silver Broom, 1977
International curling competitions hosted by Sweden
Air Canada Silver Broom
Air Canada Silver Broom
Sports competitions in Karlstad